Melita Football Club is a Maltese football club that represents the town of St. Julian's. Melita was recently promoted to the Maltese top flight for the first time ever, only to be relegated again the following season. Having finished first in Group C of the newly revamped National Amateur League in the 2020-21 season and gaining automatic promotion, the team has been playing in the Maltese Challenge League from the 2021-22 season. They also play in the annual Maltese FA Trophy.

History

Origins
Melita Football Club was founded on 28 April 1933 at the first general meeting by Sur Gian Bencini who was elected the first president of the club at that meeting. The cardinal points in its first statute were that the club would have its base in St. Julians, would have an "Amateur" status, that the original colours would be red and white and the motto of the club would be "Play the Game for the Game's Sake" and "The Game First and Foremost". Any or all of these points could only be changed by a unanimous vote at an Extraordinary General Meeting called for such a purpose.

The club has been affiliated with the Malta Football Association since 23 April 1944, representing the locality of St. Julians.

The long serving President of the Club, Anton Naudi, who had been at the helm for 26 years since 1983 when Melita were also in the First Division, has stepped down from the Presidency and his place has been taken over by a younger person, Paul Zammit, who had just been elected as the new President in the club's last Annual General Meeting of June 2009 and who himself has also been attached to this club since his playing days and whose father served the club for many years in the past as its treasurer. There is also a new Secretary, Matthew Naudi, Anton's son and also a former stalwart with the club, Alfred Zammit, who has also served the club for many years and has replaced Oliver Lautier as the club's representative on the MFA Council and John Naudi as Vice-President, also an ex player. The treasurer remains the same, Joseph Borg. The club also boasts of a fully fledged coaching and technical staff. All this makes our AMATEUR club being run and managed on a "professional" basis The club is still to date registered with the MFA as "Amateur" and still embraces this policy and belief to date. In fact, all the club's players, coaches and administrators give their loyal and dedicated service to the club on a voluntary basis. Our "Amateur" status had been threatened some years ago, in the beginning of the New Millennium, when UEFA decided that all football associations registered with it should have its clubs playing against a licence issued with UEFA regulations and criteria. This meant that Melita could ONLY keep its prestigious status up to Second Division level. Further up from here UEFA would have asked for a semi-professional status. So, the committee at that time prepared a well laid out and organised request to the MFA not to lose this status. After many meetings and serious considerations, MFA decided to grant the club a "ONE TIME LICENCE" allowing us to retain our "Amateur" status permanently. This could only be achieved as a result of our club's well known image and so a milestone in our history was registered.

Although the club has won many an honour since its foundation, the greatest of all still remains the famous 4–0 victory by the club over the well known Sliema Wanderers in the FA Trophy Final in 1939 and, by so doing, has inscribed its name among the many famous local clubs in this prestigious competition. The second biggest success in the club's history was precisely registered in season 2008–2009 when we won ALL the four competitions in our Senior Sector which the club was participating in, namely the Runner-up position in the Second Division which meant automatic promotion to the First Division and winners of the 11/111 Division K.O. Cup for the Senior Team and champions of Youth Section "B" which meant promotion to Section "A" and K.O. Cup Winners of Youth Sections "B", "C" and "D" for the Youth U/19 Team. This success has never been attained by the club before and has also never been achieved by any club member of the MFA competing in all the competitions at stake in one season. The third biggest success emerged in season 2012/2013 when the club will be playing Premier Division football for the first time in its history.

Early Years
The club was founded in 1933 by Gianni Bencini. After only six years in the Malta Football Association, Melita FC managed to go all the way to the final of the Maltese Cup. In the final Melita faced Sliema Wanderers, winning the game 4–0 – the first and so far the only major Cup trophy Melita have won. Melita made it to the final for the second consecutive year in 1940, again playing Sliema, but this time they lost the match 3–2. Their league form was very promising having shot up the leagues to play their first season of top flight football in the 1939-1940 Maltese Premier League, finishing runner-up, their highest ever league position. They kept their position among the elite of Maltese football until their relegation from the top flight in the 1947-48 Maltese Premier League.

1963-1964: Return to Premier Division
Following an absence of 16 years, Melita F.C. sealed their return to the top level of Maltese Football for the 1963-64 Maltese Premier League season.

League Standings

 Malta - List of final tables (RSSSF)

1970's-2010's: Life in the Lower Leagues
The club survived for one solitary season before a period of 45 years playing lower league football in the first, second and third divisions, with varying levels of success. Many titles have been won in the third and second division, while Melita's youth nursery team have also had their share of success, as well as a reputation for bringing through quality players that have gone on to play at the highest level. This period also saw inauguration of the Gianni Bencini Ground in Pembroke.

2012–13: Golden Era – Premier League
Season 2012–13 promised to be a historical season as it meant that Melita would be playing in the Premier League for the first time in their history. Following near misses for promotion from the 2nd tier, they finally managed to gain promotion by winning the 1st Division title. Melita's Premier League adventure started slowly; however, as the season went by some historical wins and results were obtained, including a 2–1 victory over reigning champions Valletta F.C. as well as a 5–3 victory over Ħamrun Spartans the final day of the season.

First phase

At the end of the first phase, Melita ended up finishing in 11th place and therefore qualifying for the relegation pool. At this point, the points would be halved and another two rounds of fixtures would be played. Melita did not fair very well in this phase, winning only their final game of the season and therefore confined to relegation.

Group table

2013 – 2018: Return to 1st Division
Following the clubs' relegation from the Premier division, Melita have once again cemented their place as a 1st Division team in spite of a number of players ending their playing time with the club. Melita have gone close to returning to the premier league in recent seasons, one time missing out on promotion after losing to Gzira United on penalties in a play-off decider, where the eventual winners ended up facing Mosta F.C. for a place in the 2015-16 Maltese Premier League. The club had maintained their status within the division for a number of years, although survival became the clubs ambition year after year. Unfortunately, the club's long spell in the division came to an end on 18 April 2018, following a crushing defeat to San Gwann F.C. which sealed the clubs fate.

2018 – 2020: Life in the 2nd Division
Melita F.C. will be competing in the third tier of Maltese football for the first time in 10 years following the club's most successful period. Led by newly appointed coach Edmond Lufi, the club will be looking to bounce back up to the 1st division at the first attempt with a mix of experience and youth, the majority of which are homegrown products.

Following a disappointing mid-table finish during head coach Edmond Lufi's first season in charge, an inconsistent start to the 2019-20 season ultimately led to the termination of Edmond Lufi's contract at the club, with Youth team coach Saviour Debono Grech stepped up as interim coach, assisted by former player Emilio Cornago San Pedro, until the end of the season. Unfortunately due to the Covid-19 pandemic, the season was cut short and considered null and void, with Melita in 6th position after 19 games.

2020 – 2021: Covid-19, National Amateur League & Promotion
Due to the problems associated with the relegations and promotions following an unfinished season, the MFA decided to restructure the league, with three teams getting promoted from the Second Division, and none relegated from the First Division. Moroever, the Maltese Second Division and Thurd Division would be combined, with all teams divided into three sections of 7 or 8 teams, playing each other three times each, before the champions and promotion places are decided via the Playoffs. Melita F.C. will be competing in group C, under the guidance of Coach Saviour Debono Grech, and assisted by Alessandro Ciantar and Simon Cassar. Melita breezed through the section unbeaten and with a 100% record, allowing them to compete for the 1st ever National Amateur League Trophy. Following a draw with Section A winners Mgarr United a loss to Section B winners Luqa St. Andrew's F.C. meant Melita would get promoted, yet were left empty handed. Nevertheless, the season was a successful one in the clubs history and meant that they would be back in the second tier of Maltese football following an absence of three seasons.

2021 – Present: Return to Challenge League
Saviour Debono Grech remained in charge as Melita returned to the second tier and were placed in Section A of the Challenge League, once again due to further restructuring of the Maltese leagues. A comfortable first season back saw The Amateurs finish comfortably in 5th position, just outside the promotion places yet with a solid foundation to build upon for the upcoming seasons.

Melita Nursery 

The club’s Nursery was set up in 1989 by among others, Anton Naudi & the late Oliver Lautier but has embarked on a development programme in 1998 when ex players of the club like Robert Balani and Peter Galea and others took the job in hand and today it is regarded as one of the top nurseries in Malta. The nursery caters for boys and Girls from the age of 4/5 till the age of 17 in line with FIFA & UEFA schemes, after which they will join the Senior sector for participation in the Youth and Senior teams. We have presently about 380 children registered. All the age groups participate in various and several tournaments both locally and abroad while the most senior two categories take part in the U/15 and U/17 Leagues organised by the Youth Football Association within the MFA. Neil Zarb COusin is the current technical director of the nursery, overseeing Melita players from under 4 years old all the way up to under 17 level.

New sports complex 
In 2004 Melita F.C inaugurated their first 5-a-side artificial pitches and in the summer of 2007 the club launched the Melita F.C Complex at its training facility in Pembroke, Malta. The complex includes changing rooms, gymnasiums and a 105-metre full sized 2-Star FIFA-recommended pitch, certified to host UEFA Cup and UEFA Champions League matches. The complex also includes a small stand with a maximum capacity of 70 (400 standing). When the pitches were launched they were seen as one of the best training facilities in the area.

The club can also today boast of one of the best sports complexes on the island which know its origin in 2002 when our administrators came up with an ambitious idea to construct a couple of 5 a-side pitches with high quality artificial turf. At that time, such pitches were only dreams in Malta but we had this foresight and, after careful and professional study of feasibility, we opened our first 2 pitches which could convert to one 7 a-side pitch complete with all round fencing, floodlighting and other amenities on 23 May 2004. At a later stage we also embarked on further development and a 50 space car park, additional dressing rooms and an outright conversion of our full size gravel pitch into a super artificial surface pitch known as FIFA 2 Star, which is the nearest to actual turf complete with lighting of the highest standard and FIFA approved steel surround all along the perimeter were brought to mind for discussion. Eventually all this was constructed and were officially inaugurated on 27 April 2008 along with a restructured block to house a snack bar/restaurant and a committee room, two lovely well sized terraces, a children's playground, kit room and more dressing rooms. The club is now also boasting of having the first ever Children's Gym in Malta and this is already functioning along with an adult gym both lying underground and housing the most modern and efficient equipment.

Although the club's registered place is in St. Julians where the committees meet regularly, the sports complex is situated in Pembroke as it was never possible to have such a complex constructed in the urban locality of St. Julians, obviously due to lack of space required for such a place. However, notwithstanding the club is in St. Julians and the complex in Pembroke, the club still accepts children and teenagers and adults from any locality around Malta to form part of it.

Players

Current squad
The current first team coach is Saviour Debono Grech and is assisted by Alessandro Ciantar.

Out on loan

Youth Team
Justin Rizzo is the current head coach of the Melita under 19 squad assisted by Julian Bonello, Andrew Sant Fournier and Shaun Tortell.

Managers
 Leopold Drucker (1937 –)
 George Micallef
 Alfred Zammit
 Tarcisio Azzopardi
 Pippo Psaila (Oct 1986 – May 1989)
 Alfred Debono  
 Robert Kelly (– Apr 2002)
 Steve D'Amato (Apr 2002 – Oct 2008)
 Martin Gregory (Oct 2008 – Nov 2012)
 Patxi Salinas (Nov 2012 – June 2013)
 Jacques Scerri (July 2013 – May 2014)
 Neil Zarb Cousin (May 2014 – May 2016)
 Andrea Pisanu (May 2016 – May 2018)
 Edmond Lufi (May 2018 – November 2019)

 Saviour Debono Grech (December 2019 -)

Honours
 Maltese Cup (aka F.A. Trophy)
 1939: Winners – final versus Sliema Wanderers 4–0
 1940: Runners-up – final versus Sliema Wanderers 2–3
 1999/00 Second/Third Division Knock-out Winners – final versus St. George's 2–1 (a.e.t)
 2007/08 Second/Third Division Knock-out Winners – final versus Balzan Youths 5–1
 2008/09 Second Division Runners-up
 2008/09 Second/Third Division Knock-out Winners – final versus St. Venera Lightnings 3–0
 2011/12 Maltese First Division Champions
 2020/21 Maltese National Amateur League Section C Winners
 2020/21 Maltese National Amateur League Runners-up

References 

 
Football clubs in Malta
1933 establishments in Malta
St. Julian's, Malta
Association football clubs established in 1933